Erik Matthew Ross (born 1965) is a retired United States Navy rear admiral and surface warfare officer who last served as commander of Expeditionary Strike Group 2 from July 23, 2019 to September 27, 2019. Prior to that, he served as the 67th President of the Board of Inspection and Survey from June 2017 to May 2019.

Personal life and education

A native of Appleton, Wisconsin, Ross graduated from Appleton East High School. He later graduated from Cornell University with a bachelor's degree in government (with a concentration in international relations) in 1988 and the University of San Diego with a master's degree in international relations in 1995. Ross is married to Cindy Ross and has three children: Matthew, Angel, and Danielle.

Naval career

Ross was commissioned as an ensign through the Naval Reserve Officers Training Corps program at Cornell University in 1988.

Ross's shore assignments include serving on the Strategic Planning and Policy Directorate of United States Pacific Command, director of the Fleet and International Training Department (N72) at Surface Warfare Officers School, an instructor at the Navy's Command Leadership School and chief of staff for Commander, Naval Surface Forces Atlantic. He assumed the presidency of the Board of Inspection and Survey in June 2017, coupled with a promotion to rear admiral (lower half).

Ross assumed his final command of Expeditionary Strike Group 2 from Rear Admiral John B. Skillman on July 23, 2019 in a change of command ceremony aboard Ross's former command, the USS Bataan.

Relief and retirement

On September 27, 2019, two months into his tenure, Ross was relieved as commander of ESG-2 by Vice Admiral Andrew L. Lewis due to "a loss of confidence in his ability to command". According to Second Fleet spokeswoman Lt. Cmdr. Ashley Hockycko, his firing was in connection to an “alleged off-duty incident” which called into question the flag officer's judgment. ESG-2's chief of staff, Captain Darren Nelson, assumed command of the group until a permanent replacement was named. Ross's successor, John Mustin assumed command in late 2019, while Ross himself was re-assigned to the staff of Second Fleet.

Ross was taken to admiral's mast by Vice Admiral Lewis and presented with a punitive letter of reprimand for violating Article 133 of the Uniform Code of Military Justice, according to Captain Sarah Self-Kyler, a spokeswoman for United States Fleet Forces Command. He subsequently submitted a letter of resignation and retired on August 31, 2020.

Post-retirement

Since retiring, Ross has voluntarily publicized his situation and problems with drunkenness to help other military leaders deal with their job stress in a more appropriate manner.

Awards and decorations

References

1965 births
Living people
Place of birth missing (living people)
People from Appleton, Wisconsin
Appleton East High School alumni
Cornell University alumni
Military personnel from Wisconsin
University of San Diego alumni
Recipients of the Legion of Merit
United States Navy admirals